The 2010 FIFA U-20 Women's World Cup was the 5th edition of the tournament. It was held in Germany, who will also host the 2011 FIFA Women's World Cup a year later from 13 July to 1 August 2010. Sixteen teams, comprising representatives from all six confederations, were taking part in the final competition, in which Germany had a guaranteed place as the host nation.

Venues

Qualified teams

1.Teams that made their debut.

Nigerian team ban
On 30 June 2010, President of Nigeria Goodluck Jonathan announced he would suspend the Nigeria Football Federation from FIFA competition for 2 years. This put the Falconets place at the competition in jeopardy. On 5 July 2010, the ban was lifted.

Squads

Final draw
No two teams from the same confederation were to be drawn in the same group, with the exception of Group A, which would include two European teams.

Group stage
The ranking of each team in each group was determined as follows:
greatest number of points obtained in all group matches;
goal difference in all group matches;
greatest number of goals scored in all group matches.
If two or more teams are equal on the basis of the above three criteria, their rankings will be determined as follows:
greatest number of points obtained in the group matches between the teams concerned;
goal difference resulting from the group matches between the teams concerned;
greater number of goals scored in all group matches between the teams concerned;
drawing of lots by the FIFA Organising Committee.

It has been decided by FIFA to remove the use of the fair play point system as an option to determine the ranking
of teams at the conclusion of the group phase (art. 25 par. 5g).

Group A

Group B

Group C

Group D

Knockout stage

Bracket

Quarterfinals

Semifinals

3rd Place Playoff

Final

Awards

The following awards were given for the tournament:

Goalscorers
10 goals
 Alexandra Popp

8 goals
 Ji So-yun

5 goals
 Sydney Leroux

4 goals
 Antonia Göransson

3 goals

 Marina Makanza
 Elizabeth Cudjoe
 Lee Hyun-Young

2 goals

 Débora
 Daniela Montoya
 Yoreli Rincón
 Marina Hegering
 Kim Kulig
 Svenja Huth
 Sylvia Arnold
 Mana Iwabuchi
 Natsuki Kishikawa
 Renae Cuéllar
 Desire Oparanozie
 Ebere Orji

1 goal

 Leah
 Ludmila
 Rafaelle
 Lady Andrade
 Melissa Ortiz
 Tatiana Ariza
 Katherine Alvarado
 Carolina Venegas
 Toni Duggan
 Kerys Harrop
 Pauline Crammer
 Dzsenifer Marozsán
 Elizabeth Addo
 Deborah Afriyie
 Emi Nakajima
 Megumi Takase
 Ho Un-byol
 Jon Myong-hwa
 Kim Myong-Gum
 Kim Un-Hyang
 Yun Hyon-hi
 Kim Jin-young
 Kim Na-rae
 Charlyn Corral
 Alina Garciamendez
 Natalia Gómez Junco
 Nayeli Rangel
 Bridgette Armstrong
 Hannah Wilkinson
 Rosie White
 Amarachi Okoronkwo
 Helen Ukaonu
 Sofia Jakobsson
 Amber Brooks
 Zakiya Bywaters
 Kristie Mewis

Own goals
 Renae Cuéllar (1 for Japan)
 Hyon Un-Hui (1 for Sweden)
 Osinachi Ohale (1 for Germany)

References

External links

FIFA U-20 Women's World Cup Germany 2010, FIFA.com
FIFA Technical Report

FIFA
2010
2010
Under
July 2010 sports events in Germany
August 2010 sports events in Germany
2010 in youth association football